Naija No Dey Carry Last: Thoughts on a Nation in Progress is a satirical collection of essays by Nigerian author Pius Adesanmi. The collection is divided into four parts. Each part contained essays addressing a different issue. It was published in 2015 by Parrésia Publishers and Premium Times Books.

Plot
The collection is divided into four sections:
"Naija No Dey Carry Last"
"In the Beginning was the Word"
"Open Letters to Godot"
"All the World’s a Stage"

References

Nigerian non-fiction books
2015 non-fiction books
Parrésia Publishers books
2015 Nigerian books
Essay collections